Nicolae Marinescu (15 December 1906 – 1977) was a Romanian fencer. He competed at the 1936 and 1952 Summer Olympics.

References

External links
 

1906 births
1977 deaths
Romanian male fencers
Olympic fencers of Romania
Fencers at the 1936 Summer Olympics
Fencers at the 1952 Summer Olympics
Sportspeople from Bucharest
20th-century Romanian people